Grizzly Flats (formerly Grizzly Flat and Chickenmasee) is a census-designated place in El Dorado County, California. Grizzly Flats is the town nearest to Baltic Peak, a small peak to the northwest. The population at the 2010 census was 1,066.

History 
Grizzly Flats originated as a gold mining camp in the 1850s. The name was given by prospectors who were surprised by a grizzly bear there in 1850. In 1852 it was described as being on a flat piece of land measuring approximately one mile by three quarters of a mile and having two combination bars, stores, and boarding houses, with more under construction. It was located centrally in a jurisdiction called Mountain Township. A post office opened  in 1854, a stagecoach route to Diamond Springs in 1855, and a Wells Fargo office in 1857. Catholic and Methodist churches were also established in the mid-1850s.

Fires in 1866 and 1869 destroyed most of the settlement; the 1869 fire killed one person and destroyed all but two buildings in the business district, which was only partly rebuilt.

On August 17, 2021, the Caldor Fire destroyed around 500 buildings in and near Grizzly Flats, including the original 1850s post office, the modern post office, and Walt Tyler Elementary School. Two people from the area with serious injuries caused by the fire were airlifted to hospitals. The mandatory evacuation order was lifted on September 6.

Demographics

The 2010 United States Census reported that Grizzly Flats had a population of 1,066. The racial makeup of Grizzly Flats was 954 (89.5%) White, 6 (0.6%) African American, 14 (1.3%) Native American, 7 (0.7%) Asian, 2 (0.2%) Pacific Islander, 19 (1.8%) from other races, and 64 (6.0%) from two or more races. Hispanic or Latino of any race were 96 persons (9.0%).

The Census reported that 1,066 people (100% of the population) lived in households, 0 (0%) lived in non-institutionalized group quarters, and 0 (0%) were institutionalized.

There were 432 households, out of which 111 (25.7%) had children under the age of 18 living in them, 259 (60.0%) were opposite-sex married couples living together, 17 (3.9%) had a female householder with no husband present, 23 (5.3%) had a male householder with no wife present.  There were 22 (5.1%) unmarried opposite-sex partnerships, and 8 (1.9%) same-sex married couples or partnerships. 104 households (24.1%) were made up of individuals, and 39 (9.0%) had someone living alone who was 65 years of age or older. The average household size was 2.47.  There were 299 families (69.2% of all households); the average family size was 2.94.

The population was spread out, with 235 people (22.0%) under the age of 18, 54 people (5.1%) aged 18 to 24, 215 people (20.2%) aged 25 to 44, 386 people (36.2%) aged 45 to 64, and 176 people (16.5%) who were 65 years of age or older.  The median age was 46.8 years. For every 100 females, there were 109.4 males.  For every 100 females age 18 and over, there were 106.2 males.

The homeowner vacancy rate was 3.1%; the rental vacancy rate was 8.8%.  901 people (84.5% of the population) lived in owner-occupied housing units and 165 people (15.5%) lived in rental housing units.

Climate
The Köppen Climate Classification subtype for this climate is "Csb" (Mediterranean Climate).

References

External links
 Grizzly Flats Online
 Grizzly Flats Community Services District

Census-designated places in El Dorado County, California
Populated places in the Sierra Nevada (United States)